California Scene Painting, also known as Southern California Regionalism, is a form of American regionalist art depicting landscapes, places, and people of California. It flourished from the 1920s to the 1960s.

History
Early 20th century California artists interested in everyday images and themes from the state's 19th century history provided the foundation for the emergence of the regional genre of California Scene Painting. The term was attributed to Los Angeles art critic Arthur Millier, and it referred to watercolors, oil paintings and mosaics of landscapes and scenes of everyday life, such as mountain and coastal scenery, pastoral agricultural valleys, and dynamic cities and highways.   Varying in style and subject, California Scene Painting was influenced by a range of precursor styles, notably Impressionism (particularly California Impressionism), Cubism, and Realism.

Notable artists 
Notable California scene artists included Emil Kosa Jr., Roger Edward Kuntz, Millard Sheets, Milford Zornes, Phil Dike, Rex Brandt, Phil Paradise, Elsie Palmer Payne, George Post, Elsie Lower Pomeroy, Barse Miller, Paul Sample, Dong Kingman, Anders Aldrin, and Charles Payzant. One group  — including Sheets, Dike, Brandt, Miller, Zornes, and Kosa, Jr. — worked in large-scale watercolors.  

A 2014 exhibition at the Pasadena Museum of Art included many of the best-known California scene painters.

See also 

 California Impressionism

References

Further reading
 McClelland, Gordon T., and Austin D. McClelland  (2013). California Scene Painting

American art movements
American art
Modern art